The 2019–20 season was the 95th season of competitive football in Poland.

League competitions

Ekstraklasa

Regular season

Championship round

Relegation round

I liga

II liga

III liga

Group 1

Group 2

Group 3

Group 4

Polish Cup

Polish SuperCup

Polish clubs in Europe

Piast Gliwice

2019–20 UEFA Champions League

Qualifying phase

BATE Borisov won 3–2 on aggregate.

2019–20 UEFA Europa League

Qualifying phase

4–4 on aggregate. Riga won on away goals.

Lechia Gdańsk

2019–20 UEFA Europa League

Qualifying phase

Brøndby won 5–3 on aggregate.

Legia Warsaw

2019–20 UEFA Europa League

Qualifying phase

Legia Warsaw won 4–0 on aggregate.

Legia Warsaw won 1–0 on aggregate.

Legia Warsaw won 2–0 on aggregate.

Rangers won 1–0 on aggregate.

Cracovia

2019–20 UEFA Europa League

Qualifying phase

3–3 on aggregate. DAC Dunajská Streda won on away goals.

National teams

Poland national team

UEFA Euro 2020 qualifying

Poland national under-21 team

2021 UEFA European Under-21 Championship qualification

Friendlies

Notes

References